The Local Government (Scotland) Act 1947 (10 & 11 Geo. 6 c. 65) is an Act of the Parliament of the United Kingdom, that reformed local government in Scotland, on 1 October 1947.

Section 1 of the Act reads "For the purposes of local government, Scotland shall be divided into counties, counties of cities, large burghs and small burghs, and the landward area of every county shall, save as provided in this Part of this Act, be divided into districts".

The umbrella organisation for District Councils in Scotland at this time was the Scottish Association of District Councils. Notable presidents of this body included the playwright Robert McLellan who was elected in 1962 and presided at the moment when Westminster announced its intention to institute the review local government in Scotland which would eventually lead to Lord Wheatley's abolition of District Councils in the early 1970s.

New local government areas
Section 2 defines the new local government areas. From Schedule 1:

Counties

Counties of cities
Aberdeen
Dundee
Edinburgh
Glasgow

Large burghs

Small burghs

The local government divisions established by the 1947 Act were abolished by the Local Government (Scotland) Act 1973.

References
Local Government (Scotland) Act 1947

See also
Counties of Scotland
List of local government areas in Scotland 1930 - 1975

Acts of the Parliament of the United Kingdom concerning Scotland
History of local government in Scotland
United Kingdom Acts of Parliament 1947
1947 in Scotland